Blues, Hollers and Hellos is an EP by the experimental rock band Red Krayola. It was released in 2000 by Drag City.

Critical reception
The Chicago Reader wrote that "the band deliberately deprives the songs of resolution with out-of-tempo drumming and anticlimactic noodling, and doesn't offer anything to make up for the loss."

Track listing

References

External links 
 

2000 EPs
Drag City (record label) EPs
Red Krayola albums
Experimental rock EPs